The Surfer's Path was a bi-monthly international surfing magazine founded by Alex Dick-Read. The magazine was established in 1997 as part of the Permanent Publishing stable (alongside Whitelines Snowboard Magazine and Sidewalk Skateboard Magazine). The headquarters was originally in Cornwall. It was then owned by Factory Media and had its headquarters in London, England. From 2004 it was published on recycled paper. An American edition of the magazine was edited by Drew Kampion. The Surfer's Path closed its doors in January 2014.

The Surfer's Path was then taken back into independent hands by the new editor, Tim Nunn, in 2019, and it is being published again as a quarterly journal.

References

External links
Official website

Bi-monthly magazines published in the United Kingdom
Sports magazines published in the United Kingdom
Magazines published in London
Magazines established in 1997
Magazines disestablished in 2013
Mass media in Cornwall
Surfing magazines
Surfing in the United Kingdom
Defunct magazines published in the United Kingdom